The 395th Tactical Missile Squadron is a United States Air Force unit.  It has not been active under that name.

The squadron's first predecessor was activated as the 5th Reconnaissance Squadron as the United States Army Air Corps was expanding prior to the entry of the United States into World War II.  The squadron moved to Panama as the 395th Bombardment Squadron and participated in the antisubmarine campaign in the Caribbean Sea until 1943.  It moved back to the United States to convert to a Boeing B-29 Superfortress unit and deployed to the China-Burma-India Theater, where it earned a Distinguished Unit Citation before it was disbanded when the Army Air Forces reorganized its very heavy bomber units from four to three squadrons.

The second predecessor of the squadron was organized in 1959 as the 395th Missile Training Squadron, later redesignated the 395th Strategic Missile Squadron.  It trained crews on the SM-68 Titan missile at Vandenberg Air Force Base, California until it was inactivated on 31 December 1969.  The two squadrons were consolidated into a single unit as the 395th Tactical Missile Squadron in 1985, but have not been active under that name.

History

World War II

Antisubmarine Warfare
Activated on 1 April 1941 as the 5th Reconnaissance Squadron, its personnel and equipment being drawn from the inactivated 27th Reconnaissance Squadron at Borinquen Field, Puerto Rico.   The squadron had actually been constituted as early as 22 November 1940 to augment the reconnaissance forces available to the Puerto Rican Department. The squadron consisted of three Douglas B-18As, and these constituted the sole strength of the unit at Borinquen Field until the unit was redesignated as the 395th Bombardment Squadron (Medium) on 22 April 1942.

The 5th was initially attached as an element of the 40th Bombardment Group. A "Good Will" flight was made in July 1941 to Peru, stopping en route Trinidad, Albrook Field and Guayaquil, Ecuador, which gave the unit considerable confidence in the extent of their "reach" as a recon outfit. Between 4 and 16 November, the unit provided transportation throughout the Caribbean for a group of unidentified movie stars, stopping at Antigua, St. Lucia, Trinidad, Georgetown, St. Thomas, San Juan and back to Miami. That same month, one of the B-18s represented the Air Corps at the opening ceremonies for the new Pan Am airfield at Port-au-Prince, Haiti.

After the Japanese Pearl Harbor Attack, the unit was detached from the 40th Bomb Group and assigned briefly to the Antilles Air Task Force to perform antisubmarine patrols along the Antillies chain south to Dutch Guiana.

On 25 April 1942 the squadron was redesignated as the 395th Bombardment Squadron, and on 17 June, was transferred  from Borinquen Field, Puerto Rico, to Rio Hato Army Air Base, Panama. Concurrent with this reassignment, the unit was reassigned to the 6th Bombardment Group on 9 August 1942.   The Squadron received an infusion of new personnel in December 1942, when, upon inactivation of the 6th Bombardment Group, many of the former members of that headquarters were transferred to the 395th along with new aircraft. As of 27 December 1942, the Squadron had two Northrop A-17's, three Douglas B-18's, two Consolidated B-24D's and three LB-30's, three Boeing B-17B's and two B-17E's.

On 27 April 1943, the Squadron was transferred to David Field, Panama and, exactly a month later, moved from there to Howard Field in the Canal Zone, preparatory to its departure from the Command on 15 June 1943 as part of the takeover by the United States Navy of antisubmarine patrols.

B-29 Superfortress era
Assigned to Pratt Army Air Field, Kansas in August 1943, being re-manned with new personnel. Received prototype and early production-model B-29 Superfortress very heavy bombers. Trained under Second Air Force for an extended period due to Boeing technicians making modifications of B-29 aircraft. Deployed to the new XX Bomber Command as part of the 58th Bombardment Wing in the China-Burma-India Theater, flying to bases in India via South Atlantic Transport route; across central Africa, Arabia to Karachi.

From airfields in eastern India, engaged in very long range bombardment raids on Japan.  The squadron participated in the first American Air Force attack on the Japanese Home Islands since the 1942 Doolittle raid on 15/16 June 1944, attacking the Imperial Iron and Steel Works at Yawata on Kyushu by using its forward staging base at Hsinching Airfield (A-1), China, for refueling.  Performed a total of nine missions to Japan, also engaged in very long range attacks against enemy targets in Thailand, Manchuria, Borneo, Formosa, Burma, Malaya, Japanese-occupied China, Singapore, Saigon and Cam Rahn Bay, French Indochina.  Also engaged in aerial mining of Japanese-occupied seaports in Thailand Malaya and French Indochina.

Inactivated in October 1944 as part of a XX Bomber Command reorganization.

Strategic Air Command
Reactivated in 1959 to (1) conduct Operational Readiness Training (ORT) and support the Combat Training Launch Program of the Titan I and (2) as part of the development of the LGM-25C Titan II Intercontinental Ballistic Missile.  It operated one training facility for the Titan I, launch complex 395A, and three training facilities for the Titan II, launch complexes 395-B, 395-C and 395-D. B, C and D were constructed between 1960 and 1962 and turned over to Strategic Air Command in 1964.  Flight test, evaluations, technical order verification research and development were performed at Vandenberg AFB.

The squadron was inactivated at the end of 1969, its mission turned over to the 6596th Missile Test Group on 1 January 1970.

Lineage
 395th Bombardment Squadron
 Constituted as the 5th Reconnaissance Squadron (Medium) on 22 November 1940
 Activated on 1 April 1941
 Redesignated 395th Bombardment Squadron (Medium) on 22 April 1942
 Redesignated 395th Bombardment Squadron (Heavy) on 7 May 1942
 Redesignated 395th Bombardment Squadron, Very Heavy on 20 November 1943
 Disbanded on 20 October 1944
 Reconstituted and consolidated with the 395th Strategic Missile Squadron as the 395th Tactical Missile Squadron on 19 September 1985

 395th Tactical Missile Squadron
 Constituted as the 395th Missile Training Squadron (ICBM-Titan)
 Activated on 1 February 1959
 Redesignated 395th Strategic Missile Squadron (ICBM-Titan) on 1 February 1964
 Inactivated on 31 December 1969
 Consolidated with the 395th Bombardment Squadron as the 395th Tactical Missile Squadron on 19 September 1985

Assignments
 40th Bombardment Group, attached on 1 April 1941, and assigned on 25 February 1942
 6th Bombardment Group, 9 August 1942
 40th Bombardment Group, 12 May 1943 – 20 October 1944
 704th Strategic Missile Wing, 1 Feb 1959 (attached to 1st Missile Division after 6 April 1959) 
 1st Missile Division (later 1st Strategic Aerospace Division), 1 July 19591
 392d Strategic Missile Wing, 18 October 1961
 1st Strategic Missile Division, 20 December 1961 – 31 December 1969

Stations
 Borinquen Field, Puerto Rico, 1 April 1941
 Rio Hato Army Air Base, Panama, 17 June 1942 – 16 June 1943
 Pratt Army Air Field, Kansas, 1 August 1943 – 12 March 1944
 Chakulia Airfield, India, c. 11 April–20 October 1944
 Vandenberg Air Force Base, California, 1 February 1959 – 31 December 1969

Aircraft and missiles

 B-18 Bolo, 1941–1943
 Northrop A-17, 1942–1943
 B-24 Liberator, 1942–1943
 LB-30 (B-24A) Liberator, 1942–1943
 B-17 Flying Fortress, 1942–1944
 B-26 Marauder, 1943
 YB-29 Superfortress, 1943
 B-29 Superfortress, 1943–1944.
 Titan I per Extract from 1MD Regulation Number 23-5 dtd 25 June 1960
 LGM-25C Titan II, 1959–1969
 Operated three launch silos at Vandenberg AFB for operational testing and development:
 395-B (17 Feb 1964 – 29 May 1969), 
 395-C (16 Feb 1963 – 27 Jun 1976), 
 395-D (13 May 1963 – 5 Apr 1966),

References

Notes

Bibliography

 
 
 
 
 
 

Military units and formations established in 1959
Strategic missile squadrons of the United States Air Force